Prototheora malawiensis is a species of moth of the  family Prototheoridae. It is found in Malawi.

References

Hepialoidea
Moths described in 2001
Taxa named by Donald R. Davis (entomologist)